The Men's 200 metre freestyle competition of the 2022 European Aquatics Championships was held on 14 and 15 August 2022.

Records
Prior to the competition, the existing world, European and championship records were as follows.

The following new records were set during this competition.

Results

Heats
The heats were started on 14 August at 09:00.

Semifinals
The semifinals were started on 14 August at 18:11.

Final
The final was held on 15 August at 18:06.

References

Men's 200 metre freestyle